Paronychia argentea (Algerian Tea) is an herbaceous plant from the family Caryophyllaceae that grows in sandy areas, ways, abandoned fields and dry terrains.

Description 
It is an annual species with procumbent habits, which reaches 30 cm height. Similar to  Paronychia capitata but with almost all glabrous leaves, a rigid and prominent sow, and calyx lobules with transparent margins.

The stem is glabrous or pubescent, with opposite, elliptical and mucronate leaves.

The flowers grow in lateral and terminal glomerulus. They are hermaphrodite, pentamerous and actinomorphic, accompanied with scaly silver bracts bigger that themselves. The fruit is an achene.

Habitat and distribution 
They can be encountered all around the Mediterranean Sea. It grows in abandoned or dry terrains, dunes and ditches, and flourishes from winter to summer.

Uses 
It is used stewed, as a diuretic and blood purifier, and as a plaster to cure wounds.

Taxonomy 
Paronychia argentea was described by Jean-Baptiste Lamarck and published in  3: 230. 1778[1779].
 Cytology
Paronychia argentea (Fam. Caryophyllaceae) infraspecific number of chromosomes and taxa:  2n=28
 Synonymy
 Paronychia nitida Gaertn. 1791
 Paronychia mauritanica (Schult.) Rothm. & Q.J.P.Silva 1939
 Paronychia italica (Vill.) Schult. in Roem. & Schult. 1819
 Paronychia cuatrecasii Sennen 1929
 Paronychia carpetana Pau 1895
 Illecebrum mauritanicum Schult. in Roem. & Schult. 1819
 Illecebrum maritimum Vill. 1801
 Paronychia pubescens DC. in Lam. & DC. 1805
 Paronychia glomerata Moench 1794
 Chaetonychia paronychia (L.) Samp.
 Ferriera mediterranea Bubani	
 Illecebrum argenteum Pourr.
 Illecebrum italicum Vill.	
 Illecebrum narbonnense Vill.	
 Illecebrum paronychia L.	
 Plottzia paronychia (L.) Samp.

References 

argentea
Flora of Malta